Rates are a type of property tax system in the United Kingdom, and in places with systems deriving from the British one, the proceeds of which are used to fund local government.  Some other countries have taxes with a more or less comparable role, like France's .

Rates by country

Australia
Local government authorities levy annual taxes, which are called council rates or shire rates. The basis on which these charges can be calculated varies from state to state, but is usually based in some way on the value of property. Even within states, individual local government authorities can often choose the specific basis of rates – for example, it may be on the rental value of houses (as in Western Australia) or on the unimproved land value (as in New South Wales). These rateable valuations are usually determined by a statutory authority, and are subject to periodic revision.

Canada

Rates are referred to as property taxes in Canada. These taxes are collected primarily by municipal governments on residential, industrial and commercial properties and are their main source of funding.

Hong Kong

Levied on domestic property as well as non-domestic premises. Prior to 2000, it was used to fund municipal services, the responsibility of the now-abolished Urban Council and Regional Council, through the Urban Services Department and Regional Services Department. The revenue now goes to the Treasury. The bill is issued quarterly.

Ireland
Business rates and domestic rates existed in Ireland as part of the United Kingdom of Great Britain and Ireland and were retained after independence. Business or commercial rates are still collected. Fianna Fáil promised to abolish domestic rates in its  1977 general election manifesto, won a landslide, and implemented this with effect from 1979. Local authorities lost 33% of their budget and made cutbacks. From the mid 1980s until 1997, most levied "water charges" to make up part of the shortfall. In 2013 a Local Property Tax (LPT) was introduced, which has been compared to the reintroduction of domestic rates; one difference is that LPT is collected centrally by the Revenue Commissioners before being disbursed to the local authorities.

Israel
Israel has a similar tax known as arnona that goes back to the days of the British Mandate of Palestine. It is levied by the municipality (or, in smaller localities, by the moatza ezorit, i.e., Regional Council) based (currently) on the square meterage of dwelling or business. Specific rates vary widely among municipalities, with Jerusalem and Rehovot having the highest rates in the country. In rental dwellings, tenants (rather than owners) generally pay the arnona. Single parents and some forms of economic hardship qualify for discounts or even exemptions.

New Zealand

In New Zealand, rates have provided the major source of revenue for  territorial authorities since the late-19th century. Rates are basically a tax on real-estate property. , rates made up 56% of local-authority operating-revenue.

Almost all property owners in New Zealand pay rates; those who do so are referred to as ratepayers. People who rent property do not pay rates directly, but property owners will take account of the cost of rates when they set the rent. As a result, those who rent properties also have an interest in the level of rates, as well as in the services provided by councils using these rates.

Some types of property are exempt from rate levies - government land and rail land, for example.  Other categories of property may possibly only be rated at 50% (land used for some types of sports purposes).  Māori land - particularly where ownership and therefore liability for rates are hard to establish - can also get special treatment. Exceptions are listed in Schedule 1 Part 1 of the Local Government (Rating) Act 2002.

Territorial authorities may assess property values in three different ways – on the basis of land, annual or capital value – using valuations prepared in accordance with the Rating Valuations Act 1998. The valuation process is overseen by the  Valuer-General. Each local authority, after consulting with their community, can decide which basis to use.

Councils can use a mix of these different methodologies when assessing rates based on the value of holdings, for example land value for its general rate and capital value for a targeted rate.

Councils can also levy flat charges per rating unit (i.e. each lot of land, with some exceptions where multiple adjacent lots may be considered one rating unit if in common ownership, or where multiple dwelling-units are on a single lot) - generally called a uniform annual general charge. Other methodologies also exist, such as a charge per toilet bowl or urinal, or a water charge per cubic metre of water supplied.

The Local Government (Rating) Act 2002
is the governing legislation and provides a number of options for setting rates, such that local authorities can use combinations of general rates, targeted rates and/or uniform annual general charges.

United Kingdom

Rates in the United Kingdom are a tax on property used to provide some of the funding of local government.

Domestic rates, split into regional and district rates, are currently collected in Northern Ireland. They were collected in England and Wales before 1990 and in Scotland before 1989. Outside Northern Ireland Council Tax is collected instead of domestic rates.

Business rates are collected throughout the United Kingdom, with different systems in England and Wales, in Northern Ireland and in Scotland.

United States

In the US, real estate taxes which are based on a percentage of the property's actual or nominal value are referred to as "property taxes".  The term "rates" is not used in this context.  Property taxes are the prime funding method for local government (i.e., counties, cities, townships, etc.), and are normally paid by the property owner, regardless of whether the property owner lives on the property.

See also
Property tax
Tax bracket, for income and not for property value

References

Sources
 Books

External links

Property taxes
Local taxation in the United Kingdom
Local taxation in Hong Kong
Taxation in New Zealand
Taxation in Israel
Taxation in Australia
Local taxation in the United States
Real estate valuation